Miguel Angel Barrera Estrada (born 15 November 1978 in San Jose de Canalete) is a former Colombian strawweight boxer, who once held the International Boxing Federation version of the Minimumweight world title.

Pro career
Known as "El Huracan", Barrera made his debut as a professional boxer in 1998 and was undefeated in his first 23 bouts as a pro before capturing the IBF minimumweight title by defeating Roberto Carlos Leyva by decision in 2002.  The following year he knocked out Leyva in a rematch.  In his next defense later in 2003, he lost via TKO to Edgar Cardenas.  After being dropped by Cardenas, the champion tried to rise but collapsed back to the canvas. Following the loss, Barrera had surgery the following day to remove a cerebral blood cut suffered from the knockout at the Hospital Del Prado of Tijuana.
Barrera retired after the loss.

Barrera's career record was 23 wins (13 by KO), 1 losses, 2 draws.

Professional boxing record

References

External links
 

1978 births
Living people
Mini-flyweight boxers
World mini-flyweight boxing champions
International Boxing Federation champions
Colombian male boxers
People from Córdoba Department